Funny Things Happen Down Under is a 1965 Australian-New Zealand musical film directed by Joe McCormick. It stars Olivia Newton-John, Ian Turpie and Howard Morrison, and is best remembered today for being Newton-John's first film.

Plot
The film centres around a barn that is used by a group of children as a meeting place for singing practice. When the owner of the property experiences financial difficulties and considers selling the barn, one of the children comes up with an idea to raise money. The children dye sheep on his property and market the coloured wool as a naturally occurring phenomenon.

The coloured wool soon becomes sought after by buyers all over the world. However, when the coloured wool runs thin, the owner is still in danger of losing his barn. Two station hands, sympathetic to the plight of the children, decide to help by winning the remaining money in a sheep shearing contest.

Cast
Sue Haworth as Teena
Ian Turpie as Lennie
Bruce Barry as Frank
Howard Morrison as Kingie
Olivia Newton-John
William Hodge
Kurt Beimel
Frank Rich
John Gray

Production
The film was a spin-off of the Terrible Ten TV series. It was shot entirely in Victoria, on location near Melbourne and in the studio of Pacific Films.

Olivia Newton-John and Ian Turpie were dating during filming.

Reception
Filmink magazine said the film featured "the campest dancing shearers in cinematic history".

See also
Cinema of Australia

References

External links

Funny Things Happen Down Under at OnlyOlivia.com
Funny Things Happen Down Under at Oz Movies

Films set in Australia
Films shot in Melbourne
1965 films
1965 musical films
Australian musical comedy films
1960s English-language films